Verdabbio is a former municipality in the district of Moesa in the Swiss canton of Graubünden.  On 1 January 2017 the former municipalities of Leggia and Verdabbio merged into the municipality of Grono.

History
Verdabbio is first mentioned in 1203 as Vertabio.

Geography
Of this area, 4.9% is used for agricultural purposes, while 62.1% is forested. Of the rest of the land, 1.1% is settled (buildings or roads) and the remainder (31.9%) is non-productive (rivers, glaciers or mountains).

The former municipality is located in the Roveredo sub-district of the Moesa district.

Demographics
Verdabbio had a population (as of 2015) of 163.  , 11.8% of the population was made up of foreign nationals.  Over the last 10 years the population has decreased at a rate of -1.9%.  Most of the population speaks Italian (85.4%), with German  being second most common (14.0%).

, the gender distribution of the population was 47.2% male and 52.8% female.  The age distribution, in Verdabbio is; 18 children or 11.0% of the population are between 0 and 9 years old.  8 teenagers or 4.9% are 10 to 14, and 10 teenagers or 6.1% are 15 to 19.  Of the adult population, 13 people or 7.9% of the population are between 20 and 29 years old.  35 people or 21.3% are 30 to 39, 17 people or 10.4% are 40 to 49, and 33 people or 20.1% are 50 to 59.  The senior population distribution is 11 people or 6.7% of the population are between 60 and 69 years old, 11 people or 6.7% are 70 to 79, there are 7 people or 4.3% who are 80 to 89, and there is 1 person who is 90 to 99.

In the 2007 federal election the most popular party was the SP which received 47% of the vote.  The next three most popular parties were the CVP (24.4%), the SVP (18.5%) and the FDP (10.1%).

In Verdabbio about 59.8% of the population (between age 25-64) have completed either non-mandatory upper secondary education or additional higher education (either university or a Fachhochschule).

Verdabbio has an unemployment rate of 2.68%.  , there were 8 people employed in the primary economic sector and about 3 businesses involved in this sector.  2 people are employed in the secondary sector and there are 2 businesses in this sector.  11 people are employed in the tertiary sector, with 7 businesses in this sector.

The historical population is given in the following table:

References

External links

 Official website 
 

Grono
Former municipalities of Graubünden